Gliese 674 b is an extrasolar planet approximately 15 light years away in the constellation of Ara. This planet orbits tightly around Gliese 674. It is a sub-Neptune-or-Uranus-mass planet either gaseous or rocky. It orbits as close as 0.039 AU from the star and takes only 4.6938 days to orbit. This planet has a similar eccentricity to Mercury (e=0.2). The discovery of the planet was announced on January 7, 2007 by using the HARPS spectrograph mounted on the ESO's 3.6 meter telescope at La Silla, Chile.

References

External links
 

Gliese 674
Ara (constellation)
Exoplanets discovered in 2007
Exoplanets detected by radial velocity
Hot Neptunes
6